This is a list of educational institutions in Pietermaritzburg.

Schools
Alexandra High School
Athlone Primary School
Bisley Park Primary School
Carter High School (South Africa)
Clifton Preparatory School
Cordwalles Preparatory School
Cowan House
Epworth School
Grace College
Hilton College
Heather Secondary School
Heritage Academy
Kharina Secondary School
Laddsworth Primary School
Linpark High School
Maritzburg College
Maritzburg Christian School
Merchiston Preparatory School
Michaelhouse
Pelham Senior Primary
Pietermaritzburg Girls' High School
Raisethorpe Secondary School
Ridge Junior Primary
Scottsville School
St. Anne's Diocesan College
St. Charles College
St. John's Diocesan School for Girls
Voortrekker High School
The Wykeham Collegiate
Haythorne Secondary School
Woodlands Primary School
Forest Hill Primary School
Woodlands Secondary School
Russell High School

Tertiary Institutions
Evangelical Seminary of Southern Africa
University of KwaZulu-Natal
Union Bible Institute

Pietermaritzburg
Education in South Africa